A cash flow is a real or virtual movement of money:

a cash flow in its narrow sense is a payment (in a currency), especially from one central bank account to another; the term 'cash flow' is mostly used to describe payments that are expected to happen in the future, are thus uncertain and therefore need to be forecast with cash flows; 
a cash flow is determined by its time t, nominal amount N, currency CCY and account A; symbolically CF = CF(t,N,CCY,A).
 it is however popular to use cash flow in a less specified sense describing (symbolic) payments into or out of a business, project, or financial product.

Cash flows are narrowly interconnected with the concepts of value, interest rate and liquidity.
A cash flow that shall happen on a future day tN can be transformed into a cash flow of the same value in t0. This transformation process is known as discounting, and it takes into account the time value of money by adjusting the nominal amount of the cash flow based on the prevailing interest rates at the time.

Cash flow analysis

Cash flows are often transformed into measures that give information e.g. on a company's value and situation:

to determine a project's rate of return or value.  The time of cash flows into and out of projects are used as inputs in financial models such as internal rate of return and net present value.
to determine problems with a business's liquidity.  Being profitable does not necessarily mean being liquid. A company can fail because of a shortage of cash even while profitable.
as an alternative measure of a business's profits when it is believed that accrual accounting concepts do not represent economic realities.  For instance, a company may be notionally profitable but generating little operational cash (as may be the case for a company that barters its products rather than selling for cash). In such a case, the company may be deriving additional operating cash by issuing shares or raising additional debt finance.
cash flow can be used to evaluate the 'quality' of income generated by accrual accounting.  When net income is composed of large non-cash items it is considered low quality.
to evaluate the risks within a financial product, e.g., matching cash requirements, evaluating default risk, re-investment requirements, etc.

Cash flow notion is based loosely on cash flow statement accounting standards. The term is flexible and can refer to time intervals spanning over past-future. It can refer to the total of all flows involved or a subset of those flows.

Within cash flow analysis, 3 types of cash flow are present and used for the cash flow statement: 
[Operating cash flow] - a measure of the cash generated by a company's regular business operations. Operating cash flow indicates whether a company can produce sufficient cash flow to cover current expenses and pay debts.  
Cash flow from investing activities - the amount of cash generated from investing activities such as purchasing physical assets, investments in securities, or the sale of securities or assets. 
Cash flow from financing activities (CFF) - the net flows of cash that are used to fund the company. This includes transactions involving dividends, equity, and debt.

Business' financials
The (total) net cash flow of a company over a period (typically a quarter, half year, or a full year) is equal to the change in cash balance over this period: positive if the cash balance increases (more cash becomes available), negative if the cash balance decreases. The total net cash flow for a project is the sum of cash flows that are classified in three areas:

 Operational cash flows: cash received or expended  as a result of the company's internal business activities. Operating cash flow of a project is determined by:
OCF = incremental earnings+depreciation=(earning before interest and tax−tax)+depreciation
OCF = earning before interest and tax*(1−tax rate)+ depreciation
OCF = (revenue − cost of good sold − operating expense − depreciation)* (1−tax rate)+depreciation
OCF = (Revenue − cost of good sold − operating expense)* (1−tax rate)+ depreciation* (tax rate)

Depreciation*(tax rate) which locates at the end of the formula is called depreciation shield through which we can see that there is a negative relation between depreciation and cash flow.

 Changing in net working capital: it is the cost or revenue related to the company's short-term asset like inventory. 
 Capital spending: this is the cost or gain related to the company's fix asset such as the cash used to buy a new equipment or the cash which is gained from selling an old equipment.

The sum of the three component above will be the cash flow for a project.

And the cash flow for a company also include three parts:

Operating cash flow: refers to the cash received or loss because of the internal activities of a company such as the cash received from sales revenue or the cash paid to the workers.
Investment cash flow: refers to the cash flow which related to the company's fixed assets such as equipment building and so on such as the cash used to buy a new equipment or a building
Financing cash flow: cash flow from a company's financing activities like issuing stock or paying dividends.

The sum of the three components above will be the total cash flow of a company.

Examples

The net cash flow only provides a limited amount of information. Compare, for instance, the cash flows over three years of two companies:

Company B has a higher yearly cash flow. However, Company A is actually earning more cash by its core activities and has already spent 45M in long term investments, of which the revenues will only show up after three years.

See also 
Capital gain
Cash flow sign convention
Cash flow hedge
Cash flow projection
Cash flow statement
Investment
Owner earnings
Passive income
Profit
Return of capital
Return on equity

References

Further reading 
 Auerbach, A. J., & Devereux, M. P. (2013). Consumption and cash-flow taxes in an international setting (No. w19579). STICERD - Public Economics Programme Discussion Papers 03, Suntory and Toyota International Centres for Economics and Related Disciplines, LSE. National Bureau of Economic Research.

External links
A Review of Academic Research on the Reporting of Cash Flows from Operations

 
Accounting terminology
Corporate finance
Fundamental analysis